Ochrosia grandiflora is a species of plant in the family Apocynaceae. It is endemic to New Caledonia.  It is threatened by habitat loss.

References

Endemic flora of New Caledonia
grandiflora
Vulnerable plants
Taxonomy articles created by Polbot